Juniata was an unincorporated community in Buena Vista County, located in the U.S. state of Iowa.

Geography

History
Juniata  was originally called Northam, but the name was changed due to a supposed similarity between Northam and Alarathon.

The community was founded alongside the Chicago, Rock Island & Pacific Railroad. The then-new community was announced in 1914: "The town of Juniata is surrounded by large and productive farms. A general store is needed, also a stock buyer, a meat market, butter and egg store, a boarding house and a bank." 

Juniata's population was 11 in 1915, and was 10 in 1940.

See also
List of unincorporated communities in Iowa

References

Unincorporated communities in Buena Vista County, Iowa
Unincorporated communities in Iowa